Aphonopelma moellendorfi is a species of spider in the family Theraphosidae, found in United States (Texas).

References

moellendorfi
Spiders of the United States
Spiders described in 2016